Conan the Liberator is a fantasy novel  by American writers L. Sprague de Camp and Lin Carter, featuring Robert E. Howard's  sword and sorcery hero Conan the Barbarian. It was first published in paperback by Bantam Books in February 1979, and reprinted in 1982; later paperback editions were issued by Ace Books (July 1987 and April 1991). The first hardcover edition was published by Tor Books in June 2002; a trade paperback followed from the same publisher in 2003. The first British edition was from Sphere Books (July 1987). The novel was later gathered together with Conan the Swordsman and Conan and the Spider God into the omnibus collection Sagas of Conan (Tor Books, 2004).

Howard himself never wrote the tale of this turning point of Conan's life, when, starting as wandering mercenary and pirate, he became a king. The only detail provided in the canonical Howard stories is that Conan strangled Numedides on his own throne and then crowned himself with the dead king's crown. Carter and de Camp, filling in this link in Conan's career, show that a prolonged, arduous military campaign was needed before he got to this point, that there were many setbacks and moments when all seemed lost. Also, while Conan's own courage and perseverance played a crucial role, his success also owed a great deal to a band of loyal and dedicated companions, some of whom did not survive to see the final victory.

Plot summary
Following the events of the story "The Treasure of Tranicos", Conan joins a conspiracy of former comrades-in-arms to overthrow Numedides, the mad and tyrannical king of Aquilonia. As commander of the rebel forces, he has the prospect of becoming king himself if they succeed. However, Conan has not only Numedides' loyal troops, led by General Procas, to overcome, but the magic of an evil sorcerer named Thulandra Thuu.

Chronologically, Conan the Liberator overlaps the events of the story "Wolves Beyond the Border", and is followed by the story "The Phoenix on the Sword".

Reception
Shortly before publication of the first hardcover edition in 2002 Kirkus Reviews pronounced that "[o]nce again, de Camp and Carter mime Howard's hyperbolic spirit and majestic inverted syntax with great style." The review expressed no other opinion as to the merit of the novel.

Michael Rogers in Library Journal wrote "[t]he plot is typical," but "[d]espite the corny story, de Camp and Carter's solid rep in the sword and sorcery world will guarantee fun for fans of the series."

Don D'Ammassa called the book "a pretty good story" and noted that "the military encounters are very well constructed."

References

External links
Fantastic Fiction entry for Conan the Liberator
 "Conan the Liberator" - a book   review by Cindy Lynn Speer

1979 American novels
1979 fantasy novels
Conan the Barbarian novels
Novels by L. Sprague de Camp
Novels by Lin Carter
American fantasy novels
Bantam Books books